No One Stands Alone is an album by the folk group Blue Murder, recorded and issued 2002.

All of the songs on the album are sung in ensemble, but the sound mix varies on each track. For example, the female voices are much quieter on the "male" song, "Bully in the Alley". Mike Waterson's voice is to the fore in his own song "Rubber Band". Martin Carthy plays guitar on "Rubber Band", "Blue Mountain", "Mole in a Hole" and "The Goodnight Song". Lester Simpson plays accordion on "Three Day Millionaire". "The Land Where You Never Grow Old" is probably influenced by Johnny Cash's version of the song.

In 2009 "No One stands Alone" was included in Topic Records 70 year anniversary boxed set Three Score and Ten as track twenty two on the seventh CD.

Track listing

Personnel 
Vocals on all tracks: 
 Barry Coope, Jim Boyes, Lester Simpson
 Mike Waterson
 Martin Carthy
 Norma Waterson
 Eliza Carthy

External links 
 [ Allmusic Guide album entry]

Blue Murder (folk group) albums
2002 albums
Topic Records albums